Khyber Pakhtunkhwa Elementary and Secondary Education Department or KPESED is the biggest department of Khyber Pakhtunkhwa responsible for 
Elementary and Secondary.

References

External links
 

Departments of Government of Khyber Pakhtunkhwa
Education in Pakistan
Education in Khyber Pakhtunkhwa
Khyber-Pakhtunkhwa